Swannington may refer to:

Swannington, Leicestershire
Swannington railway station
Swannington, Norfolk
location of RAF Swannington

See also
 
 Swanington, Indiana, U.S.